Sholamaligai is a village in the Kumbakonam taluk of Thanjavur district, Tamil Nadu, India.

Demographics 

As per the 2001 census, Sholamaligai had a total population of 4970 with 2475 males and 2495 females. The sex ratio was 1008. The literacy rate was 74.5

References 

 

Villages in Thanjavur district